Dumbarton East is an area of the town of Dumbarton, Scotland. It mainly consists of Victorian-era sandstone buildings built by the Denny shipbuilding company to house its workers. Within this area is Dumbarton Castle and the Bet Butler Stadium - home of Dumbarton F.C.

Dumbarton Castle sits on Dumbarton Rock at the point where the River Leven joins the River Clyde. The Castle has played a significant historical role and many well known figures from Scottish and British history have been associated with it. These include Mary, Queen of Scots, William Wallace and Queen Elizabeth II.

Dumbarton Rock is a geological formation known as a "volcanic plug", formed by prehistoric build up of igneous Basalt.

The Bet Butler Stadium, home of Dumbarton F.C., is located in Dumbarton East. The stadium was built in 2000 as a replacement for the aging Boghead Park.

The area is served by Dumbarton East railway station which is accessed from Glasgow Road.

References

Dumbarton